James Partington may refer to:

 J. R. Partington (James Riddick Partington, 1886–1965), British chemist and historian of chemistry
 James Edge Partington (1854–1930), British anthropologist